The Korea Elevator Safety Institute (KESI), an affiliated public organization of the Korean Ministry of Public Administration and Security, was established in 1992 to secure elevator safety. Especially the institute ensures elevator safety by legal inspections and activities such as education, public relations, examinations, publishing, research and international cooperation under the government's Elevator Safety Act.

Also, diagnosis, supervision and consulting of elevators and mechanical parking system are major tasks. A comprehensive Information system is operated to utilize information effectively for safety management of elevators and escalators. Its main office is located in Seoul, Korea.

Safety organizations
Elevators
Government agencies of South Korea
Organizations established in 1992